Ihor Oleksandrovych Moiseyev (born 16 May 1964) is a former Ukrainian football player.

Honours
Dnipro Dnipropetrovsk
Ukrainian Premier League runner-up: 1992–93

References

1964 births
Sportspeople from Mariupol
Living people
Soviet footballers
FC Mariupol players
FC Metalurh Zaporizhzhia players
Ukrainian footballers
FC Torpedo Zaporizhzhia players
Ukrainian Premier League players
FC Dnipro players
FC Asmaral Moscow players
Ukrainian expatriate footballers
Expatriate footballers in Russia
Russian Premier League players
Association football goalkeepers